Christopher Tompkins (March 24, 1780 – August 9, 1858) was a United States representative from Kentucky. He was born in Green County, Kentucky where, he completed preparatory studies. He studied law and was admitted to the bar and commenced practice in Glasgow, Kentucky.

Tompkins was a member of the Kentucky House of Representatives in 1805. He was elected as an Anti-Jacksonian to the Twenty-second and Twenty-third Congresses (March 4, 1831 – March 3, 1835). After leaving Congress, he was again a member of the Kentucky House of Representatives in 1835 and 1836. In addition, he served as a presidential elector on the Whig ticket in 1837. He resumed the practice of law. He died in Glasgow, Kentucky in 1858 and was buried in the family burying ground at Glasgow, Kentucky.

References 

Doutrich, Paul E., III. A Pivotal Decision: The 1824 Gubernatorial Election in Kentucky. Filson Club History Quarterly, 56 (January 1982): 14–29.

1780 births
1858 deaths
Members of the Kentucky House of Representatives
Kentucky Whigs
National Republican Party members of the United States House of Representatives from Kentucky
19th-century American politicians